Schistura arifi is a species of ray-finned fish in the stone loach genus Schistura which is endemic to Pakistan.

References 

A
Fish described in 1981
Taxa named by Petre Mihai Bănărescu